The Voice of the Heroes is a collaborative studio album by American rappers Lil Baby and Lil Durk. It was released through Quality Control Music, 4 Pockets Full, Only the Family, and Alamo Records on June 4, 2021. Its title comes from Durk's childhood nickname of "the Voice" and Baby's nickname of "the Hero" that Lil Durk had given him. The album contains guest appearances from Travis Scott, Meek Mill, Young Thug, and Rod Wave with notable production from London on da Track, Wheezy, Turbo, and Murda Beatz. It was preceded by two singles, "Voice of the Heroes", the title and opening track, which was released on May 31, 2021, and "Hats Off" with Travis Scott, which peaked at number 16 on the US Billboard Hot 100.

Background and recording
In February 2021, Durk began posting several images of him and Lil Baby during the video shoot for their song "Finesse Out the Gang Way" with the caption "The Voice x The Hero", giving Lil Baby the nickname "The Hero" and himself as "The Voice". The following month, Durk made a post on Instagram with the caption saying if the post reaches 100k comments, he and Lil Baby will release their collaborative tape. On March 15, during an interview with MTV News, Baby confirmed the album's title The Voice of the Heroes. In April, Lil Baby was spotted recording with Travis Scott. The following month, Baby and Durk teased the album's initial May 28 release date, however, Swizz Beatz stated that the album was postponed in favour of DMX's posthumous album Exodus. On May 23, Baby took to Twitter to announce the album had finished recording and was scheduled for a June 4, 2021 release date.

Release and promotion
On May 31, 2021, the title track was released as the lead single, accompanied by a music video. On June 2, the tracklist of the album was released revealing features from Travis Scott, Meek Mill, Young Thug, and Rod Wave. The album was then released on June 4. The following day, the music video for "How It Feels" was released.

Critical reception

The Voice of the Heroes received generally favorable reviews from contemporary music critics, with some critics highlighting the duo's partnership. At Metacritic, which assigns a normalized rating out of 100 to reviews from professional publications, the album received an average score of 67, based on six reviews.

Robin Murray from the Clash wrote: "It's a mark of the clear respect and friendship between Lil Baby and Lil Durk, then, that 'The Voice Of The Heroes' develops a coherent voice, with the two working towards a common goal. Sure, it's not perfect - at 18 tracks it could do with some trimming". Writing for Allmusic, Fred Thomas stated that "The nearly hour-long running time drags somewhat, and some songs could have been left off the final cut. Still, The Voice of the Heroes is carried primarily by Durk and Baby's chemistry as they adapt to each other without either of them watering down their individualistic styles".

Commercial performance
On June 5, 2021, the album received early first-week sales projections from music industry forecasters of 165,000 to 185,000 units. The Voice of the Heroes debuted at number one on the US Billboard 200 chart, earning 150,000 album-equivalent units (including 4,000 copies in pure album sales) in its first week, according to MRC Data. This became Lil Baby's second and Lil Durk's first US number one album on the chart. The album also accumulated a total of 197.71 million on-demand streams of the album’s songs. In addition, a total of 16 songs from the album managed to chart on the US Billboard Hot 100, led by "Hats Off" (with Travis Scott) and "Voice of the Heroes" that peaked at numbers 16 and 21 respectively. In its second week, the album dropped to number four on chart, earning an additional 73,000 units. In its third week, the album climbed to number three on the chart, earning 57,000 more units. In its fourth week, the album dropped to number four on the chart, earning 52,000 units, bringing its four-week total to 332,000 units.

Track listing

Charts

Weekly charts

Year-end charts

Certifications

References

2021 albums
Lil Baby albums
Lil Durk albums
Collaborative albums
Albums produced by Murda Beatz
Albums produced by London on da Track
Albums produced by Wheezy
Motown albums
Quality Control Music albums